Cautethia is a genus of moths in the family Sphingidae first described by Augustus Radcliffe Grote in 1867.

Species
Cautethia carsusi Haxaire & Schmit, 2001
Cautethia exuma McCabe, 1984
Cautethia grotei H. Edwards, 1882
Cautethia noctuiformis (Walker, 1856)
Cautethia simitia Schaus, 1932
Cautethia spuria (Boisduval, 1875)
Cautethia yucatana Clark, 1919

Gallery

References

 
Dilophonotini
Moth genera
Taxa named by Augustus Radcliffe Grote